The Curve US Open of Curling is an annual bonspiel, or curling tournament, held at the Four Seasons Curling Club in Blaine, Minnesota. It was held as part of the men's World Curling Tour from 2014 to 2019 and as part of the women's WCT from 2016 to 2019, though women's teams were invited to participate in the 2014 event. The purse for the event is $14,000 USD on both the men's and women's sides.

Past Champions

Men

Men's Contender Round
Beginning in 2019, a "contender" round was held a week prior to the main event. It was excluded from the Tour in 2020.

Women

Women's Contender Round
A women's contender round began in 2020. It was not a Tour event.

Mixed doubles
A mixed doubles event was added in 2021.

References

Anoka County, Minnesota
Sports in Minneapolis–Saint Paul
Curling in Minnesota
2014 establishments in Minnesota
Annual sporting events in the United States
Recurring sporting events established in 2014
Ontario Curling Tour events